Edmond Louis Philippe Fortier (April 10, 1849 – June 27, 1921) was a Canadian politician.

Born in St-Gervais, Bellechasse County, Canada East, the son of Octave-Cyrille Fortier, a Quebec politician, and Henriette-Émilie Ruel, Fortier was educated at the Laval Normal School, Quebec. A farmer, he ran unsuccessfully in the electoral district of Beauce against Jean Blanchet for the Legislative Assembly of Quebec in 1890. He was mayor of Lambton, Quebec. He served for nineteen years in the Militia and was Captain of the 23rd Battalion of Beauce. He was first elected to the House of Commons of Canada for the electoral district of Lotbinière in a 1900 by-election. A Liberal, he was re-elected in 1900, 1904, 1908, and 1911.

References
 
 The Canadian Parliament; biographical sketches and photo-engravures of the senators and members of the House of Commons of Canada. Being the tenth Parliament, elected November 3, 1904

1849 births
Liberal Party of Canada MPs
Mayors of places in Quebec
Members of the House of Commons of Canada from Quebec
1921 deaths